San Jose Schools, Valencia, Spain, originated in 1908 as a work of the Society of Jesus and today offers education from primary through baccalaureate and basic vocational training.

See also
 List of Jesuit sites

References

Jesuit secondary schools in Spain
Catholic schools in Spain
Educational institutions established in 1908
1908 establishments in Spain